Urban Kiz is a couple dance derived from Kizomba. The origin is the result of exportation of kizomba abroad, as well the Angolan community in diaspora introduction of the Kizomba into different countries mainly Portugal, France, UK, the Netherlands and Spain between 1980–2003. It was first popularized in social media sites such as YouTube and Vimeo. Dancer Moun started dancing since 2008, but was not known yet as reference as Urban Kiz).Enah started in 2011. However,  Urban Kiz was created in Paris, France somewhere between 2012 and 2014 by Enah, Moun. The dance still went under various names, such as Kizomba 2.0, French Style Kizomba, New Style Kizomba, because no consensus was reached on a final name. The dance style evolved influenced by Ghettozouk and remixes with R&B, Rap, Dance and Hip Hop. The newly created dance was still sold as Kizomba although it changed from Kizomba completely. After fights in 2015 the new name Urban Kiz was created and publicly announced. Though there is some controversy around the origins of the style, it's widely accepted that the brand Urban Kiz was pioneered in Paris by famous dancers Enah, Moun & Curtis.

Style of dance 

So the Urban stands for the more Ghetto-Zouk, Hip Hop- and RnB-inspired kizomba music it was danced to and the Kiz is only there to show that it was influenced by Kizomba. Urban Kiz is not the short form for Urban Kizomba, but unfortunately, many misuse the Kiz to still sell it as Kizomba. As the music changed, the dancers made new interpretations on how to move to this music.  As in many urban styles of dancing, the dance is also more in tune with the music. Urban kiz dancers synchronize their body movement to the music by using elements that are also present in Hip Hop, such as stops, taps, and isolations. Furthermore, while in kizomba, the dance is more grounded, in urban kiz, the legs are straight and the body has more tension and movement energy. The figures often require movement along straight lines or changing direction only at perpendicular angles or reversing direction. The ability to do different Urban Kiz figures also depends on the capacity of the leader and follower to apply the so-called "&-principle". The &-principle means that a step forward or backward does not directly lead to a shift of body weight, but it first starts with a tap of the moving foot (10-20% of body weight on that foot) and is followed by a gradual bodyweight transfer to that foot. Pivots and pirouettes of the lady are also more common in Urban Kiz than in Kizomba, although they did appear in Kizomba and especially in Semba (Kizomba was derived mainly from Semba influences), but not as much, since the chest-to-chest frame did not allow for it as much. The Urban Kiz music has many dynamic changes of pace, with transitions to a slower tempo (bridge in music), accelerations and breaks. Contratempos are also often performed and preferably in synchronization with the Urban Kiz and Ghetto-Zouk-beat.  Kizomba is completely different because the Kizomba music which is faster than Getto-Zouk and asks for continuous movement with fewer breaks, circular and you dance more grounded with soft knees. But Kizomba is also danced to Ghetto-Zouk but different as it is done by Urban Kiz dancers.

Criticism 

Many pioneers of this new style believe that there are more similarities than differences between Urban kiz and Kizomba. Urban Kiz receives criticism from the original Kizomba dancers, that say that if Urban Kiz differs so much from Kizomba it should not be called Kizomba so that the original dance style from Angola is preserved. The name is still disputed due to the misuse of the Kiz in Urban Kiz. Many believe that Angola and Kizomba should be credited along as the dance style spreads around the world. Lots of elements of "tarraxinha" are also visible in the new style. Some critics compared it to making a croissant with a lot of chili, give another name and hide its origin while marketing it. This is causing a lot of misunderstanding and confusion. It is being said that it is also disrespectful towards the Angolan Kizomba community because Kizomba is an Angolan Cultural heritage, although has been widely spread by all the countries in the PALOP.

Widespread 

As of 2020 Urban Kiz is danced in many countries, and still spreading fast all over the world. Though the dance and culture are still most prevalent in Europe, Urban Kiz is featured annually in dozens of dance and music festivals across all six developed continents.

References 

Partner dance